In an optical system, the entrance pupil is the optical image of the physical aperture stop, as 'seen' through the front (the object side) of the lens system. The corresponding image of the aperture as seen through the back of the lens system is called the exit pupil. If there is no lens in front of the aperture (as in a pinhole camera), the entrance pupil's location and size are identical to those of the aperture. Optical elements in front of the aperture will produce a magnified or diminished image that is displaced from the location of the physical aperture. The entrance pupil is usually a virtual image: it lies behind the first optical surface of the system.

The geometric location of the entrance pupil is the vertex of the camera's angle of view and consequently its center of perspective, perspective point, view point, projection centre or no-parallax point. This point is important in panoramic photography, because the camera must be rotated around it in order to avoid parallax errors in the final, stitched panorama. Panoramic photographers often incorrectly refer to the entrance pupil as a nodal point, which is a different concept.  Depending on the lens design, the entrance pupil location on the optical axis may be behind, within or in front of the lens system; and even at infinite distance from the lens in the case of telecentric systems.

In photography, the size of the entrance pupil (rather than the size of the physical aperture itself) is used to calibrate the opening and closing of the diaphragm aperture. The f-number ("relative aperture"), N, is defined by N = f/EN, where f is the focal length and EN is the diameter of the entrance pupil. Increasing the focal length of a lens (i.e., zooming in) will usually cause the f-number to increase, and the entrance pupil location to move further back along the optical axis.

The entrance pupil of the human eye, which is not quite the same as the physical pupil, is typically about 4 mm in diameter. It can range from 2 mm in a very brightly lit place to 8 mm in the dark.

See also
 Exit pupil
 Transmittance
 Pupil magnification

References

External links
 Stops and Pupils in Field Guide to Geometrical Optics Greivenkamp, John E, 2004

Optics
Science of photography